Sparganothina cultrata is a species of moth of the family Tortricidae. It is found in Sinaloa, Mexico.

The length of the forewings is 7.8-8.3 mm for males and 8-8.8 mm for females. The forewings are silvery white with blackish-brown markings and dispersed dark-brown, orange or cream coloured scales. The hindwings are pale greyish brown with thin darker brown lines toward the apex.

Etymology
The species name refers to the shape of the apex at the aedeagus and is derived from Latin cultratus (meaning knife shaped).

References

Moths described in 2001
Sparganothini